Richard Arthur (25 October 1865 – 21 May 1932) was an Australian politician, social reformer and medical practitioner.

Early life
Arthur was born in Aldershot, Hampshire, England and educated at Dover College.  He received a Master of Arts from the University of St Andrews (1885) and a MB ChB from the University of Edinburgh (1888).  He worked in the slums of Edinburgh, but contracted typhoid fever.  He met and married his wife, Jessie Sinclair Bruce, daughter of David Bruce, in Australia in 1890.  He returned to Europe and studied hypnotism in Paris, which earned him an MD from the University of Edinburgh in 1891.  After again becoming ill working in the slums of London, he returned to Australia and established a practice in the Sydney suburb of Mosman, specialising in eye, ear-nose-and-throat, and dental work.  He was a director of the Royal Prince Alfred Hospital from 1917 to 1920 and from 1927 to 1931 and of Sydney Hospital from 1924 to 1932.

Political career
Arthur was elected in 1904 to the New South Wales Legislative Assembly as member for Middle Harbour, representing the Liberal and Reform Party.  In December 1912, he became the inaugural president of the Eugenics Society of New South Wales. He became an early advocate of child endowment in 1916 and was a strong supporter of closer settlement and assisted immigration to reduce the Japanese threat.  From 1920 to 1927, he represented North Shore.  He was chairman of the 1923 Royal Commission on Lunacy Law and Administration and, as a eugenicist, recommended special training and institutions for "defectives".   He represented Mosman from 1927 to 1932 and was Minister for Public Health from 1927 to 1930 during the Bavin Government,  but he failed to carry a mental defectives bill.

Arthur died in Mosman and was survived by his wife, son and two daughters. His wife's sister, Mary Alexander Sinclair Bruce, was married to Frederick Smythe Willis, sometime mayor of Willoughby, New South Wales and a founder member (and first hon. treasurer) of the Corporation of Accountants of Australia.

References

1865 births
1932 deaths
Alumni of the University of Edinburgh
Alumni of the University of St Andrews
Australian eugenicists
Australian otolaryngologists
Australian Presbyterians
English emigrants to Australia
Free Trade Party politicians
Members of the New South Wales Legislative Assembly
Nationalist Party of Australia members of the Parliament of New South Wales
People educated at Dover College
People from Aldershot
United Australia Party members of the Parliament of New South Wales
British social reformers